The Portugal men's national volleyball team is the team representing Portugal in volleyball competitions. Their best results to date are winning the 2010 Men's European Volleyball League in Spain,  the second place in the 2007 Men's European Volleyball League, 3rd at the 2009 Men's European Volleyball League, both tournaments hosted in Portugal, 4th in the 1948 Men's European Volleyball Championship in Italy, the 5th place at the 2005 FIVB World League in Serbia and Montenegro, 7th in the 1951 Men's European Volleyball Championship hosted in France and reaching the 8th place in the 2002 FIVB Men's World Championship in Argentina.

Olympic Games
1964 – 2020 – did not qualify

World Championship
1949 – 1952 – did not compete
1956 – 15th place
1960 – 1994 – did not compete
1998 – did not qualify
2002 – 8th place
2006 – 2022 – did not qualify

World Cup
1965 – 1977 – did not compete
1981 – 2019 – did not qualify

World Grand Champions Cup
1993 – 2017 – did not compete

World League
1990 – 1998 – did not compete
1999 – 12th place
2000 – did not compete
2001 – 13th place
2002 – 13th place
2003 – 13th place
2004 – 12th place
2005 – 5th place
2006 – 13th place
2007 – 2010 – did not compete
2011 – 14th place
2012 – 16th place
2013 – 17th place
2014 – 13th place
2015 – 18th place
2016 – 14th place
2017 – 22nd place

Nations League
2018 – did not qualify
2019 – 15th place
2021 – did not qualify
2022 – did not qualify

Challenger Cup
2018 – 1st place
2019 – did not compete (Participated in VNL)
2022 – did not compete

European Championship
1948 – 4th place
1950 – did not compete
1951 – 7th place
1955 – 1975 – did not compete
1977 – 2003 – did not qualify
2005 – 10th place
2007 – 2009 – did not qualify
2011 – 14th place
2013 – 2017 – did not qualify
2019 – 20th place
2021 – 15th place

European League
2004 – 2006 – did not compete
2007 – 2nd place
2008 – 8th place
2009 – 3rd place
2010 – 1st place
2011 – 2017 – did not compete
2018 – 4th place
2019 – did not compete
2021 – 10th place
2022 – 5th place

Current squad
The following is the Portuguese roster in the 2017 World League.

Head coach: Hugo Silva

References

National men's volleyball teams
Volleyball in Portugal
Volleyball
Men's sport in Portugal